Rimouski was an electoral district of the Legislative Assembly of the Parliament of the Province of Canada, in Canada East, in the Lower-Saint Lawrence region.  It was created in 1841 and was based on the previous electoral district of the same name for the Legislative Assembly of Lower Canada. It was represented by one member in the Legislative Assembly.

The electoral district was abolished in 1867, upon the creation of Canada and the province of Quebec.

Boundaries 

The Union Act, 1840 merged the two provinces of Lower Canada and  Upper Canada into the Province of Canada, with a single Parliament.  The separate parliaments of Lower Canada and Upper Canada were abolished.Union Act, 1840, 3 & 4 Vict., c. 35, s. 2.

The Union Act provided that the pre-existing electoral boundaries of Lower Canada and Upper Canada would continue to be used in the new Parliament, unless altered by the Union Act itself. The Rimouski electoral district of Lower Canada was not altered by the Act, and therefore continued with the same boundaries which had been set by a statute of Lower Canada in 1829:

The electoral district of Rimouski was thus on the south shore of the Saint Lawrence at the beginning of the Gaspé peninsula (now in the Bas-Saint-Laurent administrative region).

Members of the Legislative Assembly 

Rimouski was represented by one member in the Legislative Assembly. The following were the members of the Legislative Assembly from Rimouski.

Notes

Significant elections 

In 1842, Louis-Hippolyte Lafontaine and Robert Baldwin formed the first joint ministry in the Province of Canada, and were appointed to the Executive Council by the Governor General. At that time, the law required that if members of the Legislative Assembly took a position under the Crown, the members' seats were vacated and they had to stand for re-election. Lafontaine was easily re-elected in his riding, but Baldwin was defeated in his riding of Hastings in Canada West.

To ensure his colleague could re-enter the Legislative Assembly, Lafontaine arranged for Michel Borne, the member for Rimouski, to resign his seat so Baldwin could stand for election there. (Borne was in his sixties and had infrequent attendance at Parliament.)  Baldwin, an anglophone from Canada West, was elected by the heavily francophone, but pro-reform, voters of Rimouski.

The by-election was important for the success of the Lafontaine-Baldwin alliance, and also as an early step in building political parties within the Province of Canada based on common political views, rather than purely ethnic affiliations.

Abolition 

The district was abolished on July 1, 1867, when the British North America Act, 1867 came into force, creating Canada and splitting the Province of Canada into Quebec and Ontario.  It was succeeded by electoral districts of the same name in the House of Commons of Canada and the Legislative Assembly of Quebec.

References 

Electoral districts of Canada East